Niles is a surname and a masculine given name meaning "son of Neil" which may refer to:

People

Surname
 Addison Niles (1832–1890), American judge in California
 Blair Niles (1880–1959), American author
 D. T. Niles (1908-1970), Ceylonese pastor, evangelist and president of the Ceylon Methodist Conference
 Dalwin J. Niles (1914–1979), American politician and judge
 David Niles (1888–1952), White House political advisor to Presidents Franklin D. Roosevelt and Harry Truman
 Douglas Niles (born 1954), American fantasy author, game designer and one of the creators of the Dragonlance fantasy world
 Emory T Niles, Captain Near East Relief, See Niles and Sutherland Report
 Harry Niles (1880-1963), American Major League Baseball player
 Hezekiah Niles (1777–1839), American newspaper editor
 John Milton Niles (1787–1856), American lawyer and politician
 John Jacob Niles (1892–1980), American composer and singer
 John Niles (scholar), American scholar of Old English literature
 Ken Niles, American radio announcer
 Mike Niles (born 1955), American former National Basketball Association player and convicted murderer
 Nathaniel Niles (figure skater) (1886–1932), American figure skater and tennis player
 Nathaniel Niles (politician) (1741–1828), United States Representative from Vermont
 Nathaniel Niles Jr. (1791–1869), American diplomat
 Prescott Niles (born 1954), American rock bassist, best known for his work with The Knack
 Richard Niles (born 1951), American composer, arranger, producer, guitarist, broadcaster and journalist
 Russell D. Niles (1902-1992), American lawyer, president of the New York City Bar Association and a dean of New York University School of Law
 Steve Niles (born 1965), American comic book author and novelist
 Thomas Niles (born 1939), American diplomat and former ambassador
 Wendell Niles (1904–1994), radio announcer
 William Woodruff Niles (1832-1914), Episcopal bishop

Given name
 Niles Eldredge (born 1943), American biologist and paleontologist
 Niles Fitch (born 2001), American actor
 Niles Paul (born 1989), American National Football League player
 Niles Pease (1838–1921), American businessman and member of the Los Angeles City Council
 Niles Perkins (1919–1971), American athlete and physician
 Niles Scott (born 1995), American football player
 Niles Welch (1888-1976), American stage and film actor

Fictional characters
 Niles the Butler, in the US television series The Nanny
 Niles Crane, on the US television series Frasier
 Niles Standish, in Crank Yankers
 Chief (comics), also known as Dr. Niles Caulder, a DC Comics character
 Judge Niles, in the Judge Dredd comic strip
 Lisa Niles, on the American soap opera General Hospital
 Niles, from RPG Video Game Fire Emblem Fates
 Niles, a character from the SMG4 web series, main antagonist of the Genesis Arc and the Revelations Arc.

Surnames
Masculine given names
English masculine given names
English-language surnames